Harold Scott may refer to:
 Harold Scott (police commissioner) (1887–1969), commissioner of the London Metropolitan Police from 1945 to 1953
 Harold Scott (actor) (1891–1964), British actor
 Harold Scott (politician) (1894–1961), Canadian politician in Ontario
 Harold Scott (cricketer) (1907–1997), English cricketer
 Harold Scott (director) (1935–2006), American stage director and actor
 Harold Seymore Scott, architect
 Harold "Scotty" Scott, American vocalist with The Temprees

See also
 Harry Scott (disambiguation)